Carl Björkman (31 December 1869 – 4 February 1960) was a Swedish sport shooter who competed in the 1912 Summer Olympics.

In 1912 he won the gold medal as member of the Swedish team in the team free rifle event and the bronze medal in the team military rifle competition. He also participated in the free rifle, three positions event and finished 34th.

References

External links
profile

1869 births
1960 deaths
Swedish male sport shooters
ISSF rifle shooters
Olympic shooters of Sweden
Shooters at the 1912 Summer Olympics
Olympic gold medalists for Sweden
Olympic bronze medalists for Sweden
Olympic medalists in shooting
Medalists at the 1912 Summer Olympics
19th-century Swedish people
20th-century Swedish people